The city of Danzig (Gdańsk) from 1308 to 1945 had various offices, like mayor, councillor, burgrave.  Also, separate city parts (Rechtstadt, Altstadt) had representants of their own for some time.

Mayors 

see List of city mayors of Gdańsk

Councillors of the Altstadt
Councillors of the :de:Danziger Altstadt
   Nicklaus Wilde 1433 1433 1433
   Peter Becker 1433 1437 1437
   Eggert Steinbauer 1433   1450
   Nicklaus Witte 1433 1434 1434
   Hanss Pretzman 1433   1436
   Nicklaus Engels 1433   1450
   Jordan Leberstein 1433 1435 1436
   Berent Glantz 1433   1433
   Arent Klatz 1433   1433
   Henrich Schniert 1433   1433
   Nicklaus Friedlandt 1433 1439 1454
   Nicklaus Dietrich 1435   1436
   Hanss Götteke 1435 1448 1448
   Balthasar Gutte 1435 1443 1453
   Nickeas Fischer 1439 1440 1448
   Matthis Schönaw
   Peter Stoltzefuss
   Paul Behmen
   Augustin Glunitz
   Nicklas Zanckenzin 1445 1452 1479
   Jacob Gremlin 1445   1470
   Matthias Kalow 1445   1445
   Matthis Schoppe 1445   1450
   Simon Gottlund 1445   1445
   Nicklas Herman 1445   1454
   Marten Kandeler 1456   1462
   George Herman 1451   1463
   Pawel Blossholtz 1451   1452
   Hanss Möller   1455
   Marten Erdman   1455
 1455 Nicklaus Wilcke     1464
   Marten Gratken     1485
 1455 Lorentz Falcke     1468
     Lawe     1474
   Hanss Katzenbecke     1461
   Wicentz Roggar     1456
   Peter Behme     1456
   Nicklas Zoppe     1463
   Marten  Scherenschmidt     1471
   Andreas Grewe 1457   1472
   Casper Heineman 1463   1464
   Andreas Goltke     1477
 1456 Michael Weideman     1456
 1456 Maarten Wittenberg     1463
   Baltzer Angelmacher 1457   1463
 1457 Thomas Wolste     1466
   Nicklas Hosesang
   Ertman Ranteke     1463
 1462 Hanss Drantzke     1463
 1463 Nicklaus Gottschalck     1464
   Hanss Hübener
   Casper Lumpe 1464   1477
 1464 George Behme 1465   1488
   Casper Fischer 1465   1488
   Lenhard Hawer 1473   1473
   Andreas Fantzke     1476
 1465 Hanss Bergman     1477
   Baltzer Sattler     1498
   Jacob Krentzeler     1472
 1467 Josep Toppel 1478   1500
   Nicklaus Schultz 1447   1492

Councillors of the Rechtstadt 
Councillors of the Danziger :de:Rechtstadt were numerous, over 700.

Royal burgraves 
Over 200

References

Lists of people by location
Lists of people by occupation